The Neisse University is a trinational academic network held by the cooperating partners University of Applied Sciences Zittau/Görlitz, Technical University of Liberec and Wroclaw University of Technology. The places of study are located in the border triangle of Czech Republic, Poland and Germany, which are approximately 100 km apart.

History 

The Neisse University was established in 2001, admitting students for degrees in "Information and Communication Management", currently the only course offered. Its first president was Prof. Dr. Phil. Peter Schmidt.

In 2004 it was accredited by ACQUIN.

Prof. Klaus ten Hagen was elected as the new president in 2004.

Since 2007 it has been possible to also immatriculate students from other than the three countries participating in the project. This is especially true of the new master course which is focused on an internationally diverse student group.

Profile of the university 
Neisse University has a special profile by following facts:
 lectures and seminars are held exclusively in English language
 the place of study changes from Liberec in the first, Jelenia Gora in the second to Görlitz in the third year
 international students

Study courses 
 Economics and Computer Science
 BSc. Information and Communication Management

Faculties 
Due to the changing place of study, the courses available at the Neisse University belong to different faculties of the partner institutes.

 Bsc Information and Communication Management
 Faculty of Economics at the Technical University of Liberec
 Faculty of Computer Science at the Wroclaw University of Technology
 Faculty of Computer Science at the University of Applied Sciences Zittau/Görlitz

External links 
 Website of the Neisse University
 Website of the University of Applied Sciences Zittau/Görlitz
 Website of the Technical University of Liberec
 Website of the Wroclaw University of Technology
 Academic Coordination Centre of the Euro-Region Neisse
 student-portal of the "NU Students"
 Student Portal NISA WIKISPACES

Universities in the Czech Republic
Universities and colleges in Saxony
Universities and colleges in Poland
Görlitz
Liberec
Zittau
Buildings and structures in Jelenia Góra
Educational institutions established in 2001
2001 establishments in Germany
2001 establishments in Poland
2001 establishments in the Czech Republic